Ctenocephalichthys is an extinct genus of prehistoric ray-finned fish that lived during the Santonian.

See also

 Prehistoric fish
 List of prehistoric bony fish

References

Further reading

Beryciformes
Prehistoric ray-finned fish genera
Late Cretaceous fish
Cretaceous bony fish
Santonian life
Prehistoric fish of South America
Cretaceous Brazil
Fossils of Brazil
Fossil taxa described in 1969